The 1953 Women's Western Open was a golf competition held at Capital City Club, the 24th edition of the event. Louise Suggs won the championship in match play competition by defeating Patty Berg in the final match, 6 and 5.

References

Women's Western Open
Golf in Georgia (U.S. state)
Women's Western Open
Women's Western Open
Women's Western Open
Women's sports in Georgia (U.S. state)